Romana Jalil is a Pakistani politician who has been a Member of the Provincial Assembly of Khyber Pakhtunkhwa, since May 2013.

Education
Jalil has a Bachelor of Arts degree.

Political career

Jalil was elected to the Provincial Assembly of Khyber Pakhtunkhwa as a candidate of Jamiat Ulema-e Islam (F) on a reserved seat for women in 2013 Pakistani general election.

In May 2016, she joined a resolution to establish a Women's Caucus in the Provincial Assembly of Khyber Pakhtunkhwa.

References

Living people
Jamiat Ulema-e-Islam (F) politicians
Year of birth missing (living people)